Lasiopetalum angustifolium, commonly known as narrow leaved lasiopetalum, is a species of flowering plant in the family Malvaceae and is endemic to coastal areas of south-western Western Australia. It is a low spreading or dense, compact shrub with narrowly egg-shaped to narrowly elliptic leaves and compact groups of pink to purplish flowers.

Description
The lower surface of the leaves is covered with rust-coloured and white, star-shaped hairs and the edges of the leaves are turned downwards or rolled under.

Taxonomy
Lasiopetalum angustifolium was first formally described in 1904 by William Vincent Fitzgerald in the Journal of the West Australian Natural History Society from specimens he collected near Geraldton in 1903. The specific epithet (angustifolium) means "narrow-leaved".

Distribution and habitat
This lasiopetalum grows in tall shrubland, scrub and heath in near-coastal areas from Shark Bay to near Perth and on a few off-shore islands.

Conservation status
Lasiopetalum angustifolium is listed as "not threatened" by the Western Australian Government Department of Biodiversity, Conservation and Attractions.

References

angustifolium
Malvales of Australia
Flora of Western Australia
Plants described in 2014